Licking is a city located in Texas County, Missouri, United States. The population was 3,124 at the 2010 census, making it the most populous city in Texas County.

Geography
Licking is located in north central Texas County in the Ozarks of southern Missouri. The city is located at the intersection of U.S. Route 63 and Missouri Route 32.

Climate

History
The community was named for a mineral lick near the original town site. An early variant name was "Buffalo Lick". Licking experienced growth after the South Central Correctional Center opened in June 2000, which doubled the population from the 2000 Census to the 2010 Census. Also, a small Amish community moved from Berne, Indiana to Licking starting in 2009.

Demographics

2010 census
As of the census of 2010, there were 3,124 people, 634 households, and 397 families living in the city. The racial makeup of the city was 73.1% White, 25.6% African American, 0.6% Native American, 0.2% Asian, 0.1% from other races, and 0.4% from two or more races. Hispanic or Latino of any race were 2.2% of the population.

There were 634 households, of which 31.2% had children under the age of 18 living with them, 45.1% were married couples living together, 13.4% had a female householder with no husband present, 4.1% had a male householder with no wife present, and 37.4% were non-families. 34.2% of all households were made up of individuals, and 18% had someone living alone who was 65 years of age or older. The average household size was 2.33 and the average family size was 2.97.

The median age in the city was 35 years. 12.9% of residents were under the age of 18; 16.2% were between the ages of 18 and 24; 36.8% were from 25 to 44; 23.2% were from 45 to 64; and 10.8% were 65 years of age or older. The gender makeup of the city was 73.3% male and 26.7% female.

2000 census
The 2000 census found that there were 1,471 people, 647 households, and 390 families living in the city. The population density was 847.8 people per square mile (326.4/km). There were 744 housing units at an average density of 428.8 per square mile (165.1/km). The demographics of the city were 97.35% White, 1.70% Hispanic, 1.09% Native American, 0.07% Asian, and 0.34% from other races as stated by census.

There were 647 households within the city.  26.6% had children under the age of 18 living with them, 42.8% were married couples living together, single-mother households account for 13.6%, and 39.7% were non-families.  Single-person households make up 37.1%.  Citizens over the age of 65 years make up 23.5% of households.  The average household size was 2.19, and the average family size was 2.85.

Census found that 22.7% of the city population were children.  Adult population represented: 8.8% from 18 to 24, 22.4% from 25 to 44, 20.1% from 45 to 64, and 26.0% who were 65 years of age or older. The average median age was 41 years.

At the time of the 2000 census, Texas County was one of the poorer counties in the state.  The median income for a household in the city was $17,576, and the median income for a family was $25,625. Males had a median income of $24,643 versus $17,153 for females. The per capita income for the city was $12,802. About 20.1% of families and 25.5% of the population were below the poverty line, including 33.4% of those under age 18 and 23.4% of those age 65 or over.

Education
Licking R-VIII School District operates one elementary school and Licking High School.

Licking has a public library, a branch of the Texas County Library.

Notable natives and residents
 Miyoshi Umeki (1929–2007), the Oscar-winning Japanese-born actress, died in Licking, where she lived with her only child and his family.

References

Cities in Texas County, Missouri
Populated places established in 1826
1826 establishments in Missouri
Cities in Missouri